The Lithuanian Theatre Union is the official theatrical union of Lithuania. The association awards Lithuanian stage actors and plays with annual awards, from Best Actor and Best Young Actor categories to Best Productions. It declared independence from the new Soviet-based Union of Theatre Workers (Союз театральных деятелей) before the abortive coup of August 1991 and the recognition of the independence of the Baltic states. Many of the top theatre critics and people are a member of this union, which numbered 1000 members in 1987.

Chairmen
 Regimantas Adomaitis (1987–1989)
 Juozas Budraitis (1989–1996)
 Algis Matulionis (1996–2011)
  (since 2011)
  (since December 2022)

References

External links
 Official website

1987 establishments in Lithuania
Theatre in Lithuania
Theatrical organizations
Arts organizations based in Lithuania